The 2020–21 NBL season was the 35th season for the Brisbane Bullets in the NBL, and the 5th since their return to the league.

Squad

Signings 

 The Bullets retained Nathan Sobey, Jason Cadee, Matt Hodgson, Cameron Gliddon and Tyrell Harrison who had all signed multiple season contracts that covered the 2020–21 season.
 On 19 February 2020, following rumours that he was bound for the NBA, Will Magnay announced that he had re-signed with the Bullets on a two-year deal.
 On 2 May 2020, Hodgson announced that he had decided to opt out of his contract under the Australian Basketball Players' Association agreement which was designed to protect players during the COVID-19 pandemic.
 After exploring his options, on 20 May 2020 Hodgson announced that he would return to the Bullets.
 On 17 June 2020, the Bullets released Gliddon from the last year of his contract.
 On 15 July 2020, the Bullets signed Anthony Drmic on a two-year plus option deal. He previously played for the Adelaide 36ers.
 On 16 July 2020, Tanner Krebs signed his first professional contract with the Bullets on a two-year deal.
 On 17 July 2020, Harry Froling, another former 36er, signed a one-year plus option deal with the Bullets.
 On 20 July 2020, youngster Tamuri Wigness signed his first professional contract with the Bullets on a two-year deal.
 On 13 October 2020, development player Callum Dalton re-signed with the club for his fourth season with the Bullets.
 On 28 November 2020, Magnay was released by the club after he was signed by the New Orleans Pelicans on a two-way deal.
 On 4 December 2020, the Bullets signed their second import Vic Law.
 On 17 March 2021, the Bullets released Johnson and signed former Bullet Lamar Patterson as his replacement. As Patterson was injured, Jamaal Robateu was signed as an injury replacement player.
 On 19 April 2021, the Bullets signed B. J. Johnson to replace Law after he was ruled out of the remainder of the season due to injury.

Roster

Pre-season 
To launch their season after the delayed start, the Bullets will first face the Adelaide 36ers.

Ladder

Game log 

|-style="background:#fcc;"
| 1
| 13 November
| @ Adelaide
| L 93–75
| Anthony Drmic (17)
| Tyrell Harrison (9)
| Jeremy Kendle (5)
| Adelaide Entertainment Centre4,516
| 0–1
|-style="background:#fcc;"
| 2
| 15 November
| @ Adelaide
| L 87–62
| Nathan Sobey (14)
| Harry Froling (9)
| Nathan Sobey (4)
| Titanium Security Arena200
| 0–2

|-style="background:#cfc;"
| 3
| 18 December
| South East Melbourne
| W 108–98
| Anthony Drmic (21)
| Matt Hodgson (10)
| Cadee, Sobey (7)
| Gold Coast Sports and Leisure Centre1,120
| 1–2
|-style="background:#cfc;"
| 4
| 20 December
| South East Melbourne
| W 102–100
| Harry Froling (30)
| Froling, Hodgson (9)
| Jason Cadee (8)
| Gold Coast Sports and Leisure Centrenot announced
| 2–2

Regular season

Ladder

Game log 

|-style="background:#fcc;"
| 1
| 16 January
| The Hawks
| L 84–90
| Nathan Sobey (19)
| Harry Froling (12)
| Harry Froling (4)
| Nissan Arena1,746
| 0–1
|-style="background:#fcc;"
| 2
| 21 January
| The Hawks
| L 82–90
| Nathan Sobey (24)
| Froling, Harrison, Law (11)
| Jason Cadee (9)
| Nissan Arena1,591
| 0–2
|-style="background:#cfc;"
| 3
| 26 January
| Sydney
| W 90–87
| Vic Law (27)
| Tyrell Harrison (11)
| Nathan Sobey (7)
| Nissan Arena3,406
| 1–2
|-style="background:#cfc;"
| 4
| 30 January
| Cairns
| W 105–103 (OT)
| Nathan Sobey (30)
| Vic Law (11)
| Nathan Sobey (5)
| Nissan Arena4,065
| 2–2

|-style="background:#fcc;"
| 5
| 5 February
| Melbourne
| L 96–109
| Nathan Sobey (27)
| Johnson, Law (7)
| Vic Law (4)
| Nissan Arena2,234
| 2–3
|-style="background:#fcc;"
| 6
| 13 February
| Adelaide
| L 70–85
| Nathan Sobey (25)
| Vic Law (10)
| Johnson, Sobey (2)
| Nissan Arena4,240
| 2–4
|-style="background:#cfc;"
| 7
| 15 February
| @ Adelaide
| W 74–93
| Vic Law (27)
| Law, Johnson (9)
| Cadee, Sobey (5)
| Adelaide Entertainment Centre5,183
| 3–4

|-style="background:#fcc;"
| 8
| 21 February
| @ South East Melbourne
| L 99–83
| Matt Hodgson (20)
| Matt Hodgson (9)
| Nathan Sobey (4)
| John Cain Arena2,566
| 3–5
|-style="background:#cfc;"
| 9
| 26 February
| Illawarra
| W 97–91
| Vic Law (29)
| Vic Law (9)
| Cadee, Sobey (6)
| John Cain Arena809
| 4–5
|-style="background:#cfc;"
| 10
| 28 February
| Cairns
| W 115–95
| Nathan Sobey (30)
| Harry Froling (11)
| Jason Cadee (6)
| John Cain Arena3,195
| 5–5
|-style="background:#fcc;"
| 11
| 3 March
| @ New Zealand
| L 97–92
| Vic Law (19)
| Vic Law (10)
| Jason Cadee (6)
| State Basketball Centre2,257
| 5–6
|-style="background:#cfc;"
| 12
| 5 March
| @ Perth
| W 92–95
| Nathan Sobey (31)
| Matt Hodgson (9)
| Nathan Sobey (4)
| John Cain Arena3,421
| 6–6
|-style="background:#cfc;"
| 13
| 7 March
| @ Melbourne
| W 88–96
| Matt Hodgson (24)
| Vic Law (15)
| Nathan Sobey (5)
| John Cain Arena3,696
| 7–6
|-style="background:#cfc;"
| 14
| 11 March
| Adelaide
| W 109–104
| Nathan Sobey (30)
| Matt Hodgson (7)
| Vic Law (4)
| John Cain Arena997
| 8–6
|-style="background:#fcc;"
| 15
| 13 March
| Sydney
| L 108–119
| Nathan Sobey (35)
| Hodgson, Law (9)
| Cadee, Sobey (6)
| John Cain Arena4,183
| 8–7

|-style="background:#cfc;"
| 16
| 20 March
| New Zealand
| W 88–67
| Harry Froling (20)
| Matt Hodgson (10)
| Jason Cadee (4)
| Nissan Arena3,386
| 9–7
|-style="background:#fcc;"
| 17
| 27 March
| New Zealand
| L 76–81 (OT)
| Anthony Drmic (25)
| Tyrell Harrison (16)
| Harry Froling (3)
| Nissan Arena2,935
| 9–8
|-style="background:#fcc;"
| 18
| 29 March
| @ Illawarra
| L 96–72
| Jason Cadee (17)
| Matt Hodgson (9)
| Nathan Sobey (6)
| WIN Entertainment Centre2,521
| 9–9

|-style="background:#fcc;"
| 19
| 3 April
| @ Sydney
| L 90–71
| Nathan Sobey (31)
| Tyrell Harrison (19)
| Harry Froling (5)
| Qudos Bank Arena5,439
| 9–10
|-style="background:#cfc;"
| 20
| 7 April
| @ Illawarra
| W 82–88
| Jason Cadee (22)
| Matt Hodgson (14)
| Nathan Sobey (6)
| WIN Entertainment Centre2,426
| 10–10
|-style="background:#fcc;"
| 21
| 12 April
| @ Melbourne
| L 98–89
| Nathan Sobey (30)
| Matt Hodgson (8)
| Jason Cadee (7)
| John Cain Arena3,422
| 10–11
|-style="background:#fcc;"
| 22
| 16 April
| @ New Zealand
| L 91–71
| Matt Hodgson (16)
| Harrison, Hodgson, Sobey (6)
| Nathan Sobey (2)
| Silverdome1,559
| 10–12
|-style="background:#fcc;"
| 23
| 23 April
| @ Perth
| L 92–74
| Harry Froling (20)
| Lamar Patterson (10)
| Nathan Sobey (5)
| RAC Arena4,737
| 10–13
|-style="background:#cfc;"
| 24
| 29 April
| @ South East Melbourne
| W 82–94
| Lamar Patterson (27)
| Matt Hodgson (9)
| Nathan Sobey (8)
| John Cain Arena1,026
| 11–13

|-style="background:#fcc;"
| 25
| 1 May
| @ Adelaide
| L 101–79
| Nathan Sobey (20)
| Matt Hodgson (9)
| Nathan Sobey (8)
| Adelaide Entertainment Centre6,683
| 11–14
|-style="background:#cfc;"
| 26
| 8 May
| @ Cairns
| W 87–96
| Nathan Sobey (25)
| Harrison, Sobey (9)
| Nathan Sobey (5)
| Cairns Pop-Up Arena1,903
| 12–14
|-style="background:#cfc;"
| 27
| 13 May
| Sydney
| W 93–70
| Anthony Drmic (28)
| Tyrell Harrison (7)
| Nathan Sobey (8)
| Nissan Arena1,373
| 13–14
|-style="background:#fcc;"
| 28
| 15 May
| Perth
| L 90–102
| Nathan Sobey (24)
| Hodgson, Patterson (9)
| Lamar Patterson (7)
| Nissan Arena3,405
| 13–15
|-style="background:#cfc;"
| 29
| 19 May
| Perth
| W 91–88
| Lamar Patterson (23)
| Matt Hodgson (12)
| Jason Cadee (5)
| Nissan Arena1,332
| 14–15
|-style="background:#fcc;"
| 30
| 22 May
| South East Melbourne
| L 66–95
| Anthony Drmic (20)
| Tyrell Harrison (8)
| Cadee, Sobey (4)
| Nissan Arena2,533
| 14–16
|-style="background:#fcc;"
| 31
| 24 May
| Melbourne
| L 88–99
| Nathan Sobey (20)
| Matthew Hodgson (9)
| Jason Cadee (5)
| Nissan Arena1,614
| 14–17
|-style="background:#cfc;"
| 32
| 26 May
| @ Cairns
| W 96–101
| Nathan Sobey (21)
| Harry Froling (8)
| Nathan Sobey (8)
| Cairns Pop-Up Arena1,908
| 15–17
|-style="background:#cfc;"
| 33
| 30 May
| @ New Zealand
| W 83–95
| Lamar Patterson (21)
| Matt Hodgson (9)
| Jason Cadee (8)
| Spark Arena7,612
| 16–17

|-style="background:#cfc;"
| 34
| 2 June
| @ South East Melbourne
| W 84–91
| Nathan Sobey (22)
| Nathan Sobey (9)
| Cadee, Sobey (6)
| Cairns Pop-Up Arenaclosed event
| 17–17
|-style="background:#fcc;"
| 35
| 5 June
| @ Sydney
| L 83–82
| Nathan Sobey (22)
| Nathan Sobey (8)
| Nathan Sobey (8)
| Qudos Bank Arena9,267
| 17–18
|-style="background:#cfc;"
| 36
| 8 June
| South East Melbourne
| W 94–84
| Lamar Patterson (19)
| Nathan Sobey (11)
| Nathan Sobey (4)
| Nissan Arena2,508
| 18–18

Awards

Player of the Week 
Round 3, Vic Law, Nathan Sobey

Round 21, Nathan Sobey

See also 

 2020–21 NBL season
 Brisbane Bullets

References

External links 

 Official Website

Brisbane Bullets
Brisbane Bullets seasons
Brisbane Bullets season